Mílton Alves da Silva (born October 16, 1931 - 1979), known as Salvador, was a Brazilian former football player. He was born in Porto Alegre, Brazil, and played for clubs in Brazil, Argentina and Uruguay. He died in São Paulo.

Teams
 Palmeiras 1950
 Grêmio 1950-1951
 Internacional 1951-1955
 Peñarol 1955-1960
 River Plate 1961
 Estudiantes de La Plata 1962
 Metropol 1965

Titles
 Internacional 1951, 1952, 1953 and 1955 (Rio Grande do Sul State Championship)
 Peñarol 1958, 1959 and 1960 (Uruguayan Primera División Championship), 1960 (Copa Libertadores de América)

References

External links
 Profile at mamvs.narod.ru

1931 births
1979 deaths
Footballers from Porto Alegre
Brazilian footballers
Brazilian expatriate footballers
Brazil international footballers
Sport Club Internacional players
Sociedade Esportiva Palmeiras players
Estudiantes de La Plata footballers
Club Atlético River Plate footballers
Peñarol players
Copa Libertadores-winning players
Argentine Primera División players
Expatriate footballers in Argentina
Expatriate footballers in Uruguay
Brazilian expatriate sportspeople in Argentina
Brazilian expatriate sportspeople in Uruguay
Association football midfielders
Esporte Clube Metropol players